The Bulgaria national beach soccer team represents Bulgaria in international beach soccer competitions and is controlled by the BFU, the governing body for football in Bulgaria.

Current squad
Correct as of July 2019

Coach: Simeon Hristov

Achievements
 Euro Beach Soccer League Division B 
 2013 The Hague, Netherlands, July 19–21 July : Third place
 2014 Siófok, 8–10 August: Runner up
 2014 Promotional Final Torredembarra, 14–17 August : 7th place
 2016 Siófok, 12–14 August : Third place
 2017 Siófok, 11–13 August : Runner up
 2017 Promotional Final Terracina, 14–17 September : 6th place
 2018 Nazaré, 6–8 July : WINNER
 2018 Promotional Final Alghero, 6–9 September : Third place
 2019 Nazaré, 5–7 July : Runner up
 2019 Promotional Final Figueira da Foz, 5–8 September : withdrew
 FIFA Beach Soccer World Cup qualification (UEFA) Best: Group Stage
 2009
 2011
 2012
 2014
 2016

External links
 Squad
 Team Profile at bsrussia.com

European national beach soccer teams
Beach Soccer